Mirco Dwight Tadeo Colina (born 23 May 1990) is a Curaçaoan footballer who plays forward for CSD Barber in the Sekshon Pagá and for the Curaçao national team.

Club career
Born in Willemstad, Netherlands Antilles, Colina began his career with S.V. Vesta in the Sekshon Pagá, the highest level of football in Curaçao. He parted with the club after five seasons, playing briefly for RKV FC Sithoc before signing with RKSV Centro Dominguito, whom he helped to their third national championship in 2013. Playing one more season with Centro, Colina then transferred to CSD Barber.

International career
Colina plays for the national team of Curaçao, having previously played for the Netherlands Antilles before the country's dissolution. He made his debut for the Netherlands Antilles on 13 October 2010 in a 2010 Caribbean Cup qualification match against Suriname which ended in a 2–1 loss. He then made four more appearances for the Netherlands Antilles playing against Guyana, Saint Lucia, Aruba and Suriname.

On 19 August 2011, Colina made his first appearance for Curaçao in the countries first official match after the dissolution of the Netherlands Antilles, a friendly encounter against the Dominican Republic ending in a 1–0 loss. On 25 September 2011 he scored his first two goals for the national team in a 2–2 draw with Suriname.

Career statistics

International performance
Statistics accurate as of matches played on 15 November 2014,

International goals
Scores and results list Curaçao's goal tally first.

Honors

Club
RKSV Centro Dominguito
 Sekshon Pagá (1): 2013

References

External links

1990 births
Living people
People from Willemstad
Dutch Antillean footballers
Netherlands Antilles international footballers
Curaçao footballers
Curaçao international footballers
Sekshon Pagá players
Association football forwards
Dual internationalists (football)
Centro Social Deportivo Barber players
RKSV Centro Dominguito players
S.V. Vesta players
RKV FC Sithoc players